Klonowski (feminine: Klonowska, plural: Klonowscy) is a surname. Notable people with the surname include:

 Ewa Klonowski (born 1946), Polish-born forensic anthropologist
 Henry Klonowski (1898–1977), American Catholic bishop
 Marta Klonowska (born 1964), Polish glass maker
 Włodzimierz Klonowski (1945–2020), Polish biomedical physicist

See also
 
 Klonowskie Range

Polish-language surnames